The Syriac Orthodox Patriarch of Antioch and All the East is the head of the Syriac Orthodox Church. According to tradition, the patriarchate of Antioch was established by Saint Peter in the 1st century AD, but split into two separate lines of patriarchs after the deposition of Patriarch Severus of Antioch in 518 over the issue of the Council of Chalcedon of 451. The non-Chalcedonian supporters of Severus went on to form what is now known as the Syriac Orthodox Church, whilst the Chalcedonians developed the church now known as the Greek Orthodox Church of Antioch.

The Syriac Orthodox Church underwent schism in the medieval era, first, after the death of Patriarch Philoxenus I Nemrud in 1292 with the formation of separate patriarchates of Mardin and Melitene, and again in 1364 due to the emergence of a patriarchate of Tur Abdin. A line of patriarchs in communion with the Catholic Church split permanently in 1782, and thus formed the Syriac Catholic Church.

The following is a list of all the incumbents of the office of Syriac Orthodox Patriarch of Antioch.

List of patriarchs

Patriarchs of Antioch before 512

Syriac patriarchs from 512 to 1292
Unless otherwise stated, all information is from the Gorgias Encyclopedic Dictionary of the Syriac Heritage, and the list provided in The Syriac World, as noted in the bibliography below. Numeration includes incumbents deemed legitimate by the Syriac Orthodox Church prior to the schism in 518.

Severus I (512–538)
vacant (538–c. 544/557)
Sergius of Tella (c. 544–c. 547; c. 557–560)
vacant (c. 547–c. 551; 560–564)
Paul II (c. 551/564–578)
vacant (578–581)
Peter III (578/581–591)
Julian II (591–594)
vacant (594–603)
Athanasius I Gammolo (594/595/603–631)
John III (631–648)
Theodore (649–666/667)
Severus II bar Masqeh (667/668–680/684)
vacant (680–684)
Athanasius II Baldoyo (683/684–687)
Julian III (687–707/708)
Elias I (709–723/724)
Athanasius III (724–739/740)
Iwannis I (739/740–754/755)
Isaac I (755–756)
Athanasius Sandalaya (756–758)
George I (758/759–789/790)
John of Raqqa (758–762)
David of Dara (762–774)
Joseph (790–791/792)
Quriaqos of Tagrit (793–817)
Abraham (807/808–837)
Dionysius I Telmaharoyo (818–845)
Simeon (c. 837)
John IV (846/847–873/874)
vacant (874–878)
Ignatius II (878–883)
vacant (883–887)
Theodosius Romanus (887–896)
vacant (896–897)
Dionysius II (896/897–908/909)
John V (910–922)
Basil I (923–935)
John VI (936–953)
Iwannis II (954–957)
Dionysius III (958–961)
Abraham I (962–963)
vacant (963–965)
John VII Sarigta (965–985)
Athanasius IV Salhoyo (986/987–1002/1003)
John VIII bar Abdoun (1004–1030/1031/1033)
Dionysius IV Yahyo (1031–1042)
vacant (1042–1049)
John IX bar ʿAbdun (1042/1048/1049–1057)
Athanasius V Yahyo (1057/1058–1062/1064)
John X bar Shushan (1063/1064–1072/1073)
Basil II (1074–1075)
John bar ʿAbdun (1075–1076/1077)
Dionysius V Lazarus (1077–1078/1079)
vacant (1078/1079–86)
Iwannis III (1086–1087/1088)
Dionysius VI (1088–1090)
Athanasius VI bar Khamoro (1090/1091–1129)
John XI bar Mawdyono (1129/1130–1137)
Athanasius VII bar Qatra (1138/1139–1166)
Michael I (1166–1199)
Theodore bar Wahbun (1180–1193)
Athanasius VIII bar Salibi (1199–1207)
Michael II the Younger (1199/1200–1215)
John XII (1207/1208–1219/1220)
vacant (1220–1222)
Ignatius III David (1222–1252)
Dionysius VII ʿAngur (1252–1261)
John XIII bar Ma'dani (1252–1263)
Ignatius IV Yeshu (1264–1282/1283)
Philoxenus I Nemrud (1283–1292)

Syriac patriarchs from 1292 to 1445
On the death of Patriarch Philoxenus I Nemrud in 1292, the Syriac Orthodox Church split into the patriarchates of Antioch, Mardin, and Melitene. A separate patriarchate of Tur Abdin broke off from the patriarchate of Mardin in 1364. The patriarchate of Melitene ended in c. 1360, and the patriarch of Mardin Ignatius Behnam Hadloyo was acknowledged as the patriarch of Antioch in 1445, thus ending the schism.

Patriarchate of Antioch
Michael II (1292–1312)
Michael III Yeshu (1313–1349)
Basil III Gabriel (1349–1387)
Philoxenus II (1387–c. 1421)
Basil IV Simon (1421/1422–1444/1445)

Patriarchate of Mardin
Ignatius bar Wahib (1293–1333)
Ignatius Ismail (1333–1365/1366)
Ignatius Shahab (1365/1366–1381)
Ignatius Abraham bar Garib (1382–1412)
Ignatius Behnam Hadloyo (1412–1445)

Patriarchate of Melitene
Ignatius Constantine (1292–1293)
Ignatius Philoxenus (1349–c. 1360)

Patriarchate of Tur Abdin (1364–1840)

Syriac patriarchs from 1445 to 1782
Ignatius Behnam Hadloyo (1445–1455)
Ignatius Khalaf Maʿdnoyo (1455/1456–84)
Ignatius John XIV (1484–1493)
Ignatius Noah of Lebanon (1493/1494–1509)
Ignatius Yeshu I (1509–1510/1519)
Ignatius Jacob I (1510/1512–1517/1519)
Athanasius bar Subay (1511–between 1514 and 1518)
Ignatius David I (1519–1521)
Ignatius Abdullah I (1521–1557)
Ignatius Ni'matallah (1557–1576)
Ignatius David II Shah (1576–1591)
Ignatius Pilate (1591–1597)
Ignatius Hidayat Allah (1597/1598–1639/1640)
Ignatius Simon (1640–1653)
Ignatius Shukrallah I (1640–1670)
Ignatius Yeshu II (1653/1655–1661)
Ignatius Abdulmasih I (1661/1662–1686)
Ignatius George II (1687–1708)
Ignatius Isaac II (1709–1722)
Ignatius Shukrallah II (1722/1723–1745)
Ignatius George III (1745/1746–1768)
Ignatius George IV (1768–1781)

Syriac Orthodox patriarchs from 1782 to present

Ignatius Matthew (1782–1817/1819)
Ignatius Yunan (1817–1818)
Ignatius George V (1819–1836/1839)
Ignatius Elias II (1836/1839–1847)
Ignatius Jacob II (1847–1871)
Ignatius Peter IV (1872–1894)
Ignatius Abdulmasih II (1894/1895–1903)
Ignatius Abdullah II (1906–1915)
vacant (1915–1917)
Ignatius Elias III (1917–1932/1933)
Ignatius Aphrem I (1933–1957)
Ignatius Jacob III (1957–1980)
Ignatius Zakka I (1980–2014)
Ignatius Aphrem II (2014–present)

See also
Patriarch of Tur Abdin
Catholicos of India

References
Notes

Citations

Bibliography

Turkey religion-related lists
Lists of Oriental Orthodox Christians
Lists of patriarchs
Syriac Orthodox Patriarchs of Antioch
Syria religion-related lists
Iraq religion-related lists